Joseph R. Duplin (May 30, 1934 – August 7, 2016) was an American sailor in the Star class who won the 1963 Star World Championships together with Francis Dolan.

Duplin died at his home on August 7, 2016, due to complications from Alzheimer's disease. He was 82.

References

1934 births
2016 deaths
American male sailors (sport)
Star class sailors
Tufts Jumbos sailors
US Sailor of the Year
Star class world champions
World champions in sailing for the United States